Fawzia Al-Abbasi (October 1940 – 27 April 2021) was an Egyptian journalist and television pioneer. She presented many television programs since the beginning of television broadcasting in Egypt in 1960, most notably: Twenty Questions, for Adults Only, The World of Literature. Fawzia Al-Abbasi moved to the United Arab Emirates, where she presented successful television programs. She returned to Egypt in 1986 and started two new programs: Letters and Numbers and Kalima in the Evening. The Kalima program continued on the network for seven years and is considered one of the most popular shows she put out on Egyptian television.

Al-Abbasi died on 27 April 2021, aged 80.

References

Egyptian journalists
Egyptian television personalities
Egyptian women
1940 births
2021 deaths
People from Cairo Governorate
Place of death missing